Adam Tippett (born 28 November 1979) is a former professional rugby league footballer who played for the Wests Tigers.

External links
RLP Profile

1979 births
Living people
Australian rugby league players
Rugby league halfbacks
Wests Tigers players
Place of birth missing (living people)